Castle Rock is a bold rock crag,  high, standing  northeast of Hut Point on the central ridge of Hut Point Peninsula, Ross Island. It was discovered by the British National Antarctic Expedition, 1901–04, under Robert Falcon Scott, who so named it because of its shape.

Today, there is a recreation trail from McMurdo Station and Scott Base which provides access to Castle Rock year round.

Castle Rock Hut
Castle Rock Hut is a shelter located on a recreational trail, starting from McMurdo to Castle Rock, in order to provide a refuge in the event of a weather emergency.

See also
 List of Antarctic field camps

References

External links

Nunataks of Ross Island